Manlio Scopigno (20 November 1925 – 25 September 1993) was an Italian professional football player and coach. Known as "il Filosofo" (the Philosopher), he is best known for coaching Cagliari to win their only Serie A title in 1970.

Playing career 
Born in Paularo, in the province of Udine, he moved to Rieti at a young age. He began playing as a right-back for Rieti between the Serie C and Serie B.

He moved to Salernitana, with whom he played in the Serie B; in the 1948–49 season, Scopigno played as a goalkeeper against Lecce due to 's injury; he conceded four goals.

In 1951, he joined Napoli. After scoring his first Serie A goal against Como, Scopigno suffered a knee injury in 1951; this ultimately ended his career, as he only played a few more games for Napoli and Catanzaro.

Managerial career 
After having coached Rieti,  and Ortona, Scopigno was appointed assistant coach of Vicenza in 1959. He became head coach in 1961, remaining in charge until 1965.

Scopigno had a short experience with Bologna in the 1965–66 Serie A, before being appointed head coach of newly-promoted side Cagliari in 1966. In 1967, Cagliari participated in the United Soccer Association as the "Chicago Mustangs"; Scopigno led his side to a third-place finish. He helped Cagliari win their first Serie A title in the 1969–70 season. Scopigno left in 1972.

Scopigno ended his coaching career having also taken charge of Roma in 1973 and Vicenza between 1974 and 1976.

Honours

Manager
Cagliari
 Serie A: 1969–70

References

1925 births
1993 deaths
People from the Province of Udine
Footballers from Friuli Venezia Giulia
Italian footballers
Association football fullbacks
F.C. Rieti players
U.S. Salernitana 1919 players
S.S.C. Napoli players
U.S. Catanzaro 1929 players
Serie A players
Serie B players
Serie C players
Italian football managers
F.C. Rieti managers
L.R. Vicenza managers
Bologna F.C. 1909 managers
Cagliari Calcio managers
Chicago Mustangs (1967–68) coaches
A.S. Roma managers
Serie A managers
Serie B managers
Serie C managers
North American Soccer League (1968–1984) coaches
Italian expatriate football managers
Italian expatriate sportspeople in the United States
Expatriate soccer managers in the United States